The 2001 UCI Juniors Track World Championships were the 27th annual Junior World Championships for track cycling held at Trexlertown, Pennsylvania, in the United States, from 25 to 29 July 2001.

The Championships had six events for men (1 kilometre time trial, Points race, Individual pursuit, Team pursuit, Sprint and Team sprint) and four for women (500 metre time trial, Points race, Individual pursuit and Sprint).

Events

Medal table

References

UCI Juniors Track World Championships
2001 in track cycling
2001 in American sports